Marina Ortega Otero (born 22 January 1983) is a Spanish politician. She was a member of the Congress of Deputies between 2019 and 2020.

She has sat in the Parliament of Galicia since 2020.

See also 
 13th Congress of Deputies
 14th Congress of Deputies

References 

1983 births
Living people
Spanish Socialist Workers' Party politicians
Members of the 13th Congress of Deputies (Spain)
Members of the 14th Congress of Deputies (Spain)
21st-century Spanish politicians
21st-century Spanish women politicians
Members of the 10th Parliament of Galicia